Siering is a German surname. Notable people with the surname include:

Constanze Siering (born 1991), German rower
Lauri Siering (born 1957), American swimmer 

German-language surnames